In Hawaiian mythology, Poliahu (Cloaked bosom or temple bosom) is one of the four goddesses of snow, all enemies of Pele. She was thought to reside on Mauna Kea, which if measured from the seafloor is the world's tallest mountain.

Legends

Aiwohikupua 
Poliahu met the alii Aiwohikupua on the Eastern slope of Mauna Kea. The two fell in love and Aiwohikupua took Poliahu home to his native Kauai. There Poliahu discovered that the alii was already betrothed to a princess of Maui. Poliahu left in dismay, but managed to first curse the betrothed. She first chilled the princess of Maui to the bone, then turned the cold into heat. Finally, the princess gave up and left him. Later Poliahu similarly cursed Aiwohikupua, freezing him to death. The four goddesses are defined by their otherworldly beauty. Poliahu is noted as Hawaii's most beautiful goddess.

Poliahu and Pele 
Poliahu also engineered Hawaii's Hāmākua Coast.

Poliahu mingled with humans on the East slope of Mauna Kea. One day, while hōlua sledding with mortals, Poliahu was joined by a beautiful stranger who challenged her. The stranger had no sled, so she borrowed one to run against Poliahu.

In the first run, Poliahu easily passed the stranger. Graciously, Poliahu exchanged sleds with the stranger, before winning again. On the third run, the stranger tried to prevent Poliahu from winning by opening lava streams in front of her, revealing herself as the volcano goddess Pele.

Poliahu ran towards the top of the mountain, reeling from Pele's attack. Once she regained her composure, Poliahu threw snow at the lava and froze it, confining it to the island's Southern end. To this day, Pele is said to rule Kīlauea and Mauna Loa, but must submit to Poliahu on the northern end of the island.

References

External links
 Hawaiian Legends of Volcanoes - Pele and the Snow Goddess
 Poliahu, Goddess of Mauna Kea
 Poli`ahu and Pele: Legend as information science

Hawaiian goddesses
Sky and weather goddesses